Box Canyon Dam may refer to:

Box Canyon Dam (Washington), in the U.S. State of Washington
Box Canyon Dam (California), in the U.S. State of California